Downham School was a private boarding school for girls based at Down Hall, a Victorian country house near Hatfield Heath, Essex.

The school was established in 1932. Eleanor Louisa Houison-Craufurd was the first principal from 1932 to 1950. The school focused less on education and more on preparing well-born young ladies for advantageous marriages. In her 2007 memoir, alumnae Clarissa Eden described the school as "a fashionable boarding school ... orientated to horses". Down Hall was sold in the 1960s and the school closed circa 1967, the house becoming a conference centre.

Notable former pupils
 Jennifer Forwood, 11th Baroness Arlington, peeress 
 Clarissa Eden, Countess of Avon, spouse of the prime minister of the United Kingdom
 Lady Caroline Blackwood, writer
 Lady Martha Bruce, prison governor 
 Elizabeth Carnegy, Baroness Carnegy of Lour, academic and activist
 Pamela Harriman, Ambassador of the United States of America to France
 Lady Elizabeth Shakerley, party planner
 Frances Shand Kydd, mother of Diana, Princess of Wales

References

Defunct girls' schools in the United Kingdom
Girls' schools in Essex
Educational institutions established in 1932
1932 establishments in England
1960s disestablishments in England